The Oneonta State Red Dragons women's soccer team represents the State University of New York at Oneonta in Oneonta, New York. The school's team currently competes at the Division III level in the SUNYAC conference. The team plays its home matches at the Red Dragon Tennis Field on the campus. The team won the 2003 NCAA Tournament under coach and current Oneonta Athletic Director Tracey Ranieri, and are currently coached by Liz McGrail.

The program also had an NCAA-Record 101-game unbeaten streak within conference play, the longest such streak in NCAA history among the three divisions. The streak ended on October 6, 2007, to Plattsburgh. The 2007 team rebounded after the loss and won its next seven SUNYAC games, the seventh being the Conference Championship on November 3 to advance to the 2007 NCAA Tournament.

The Red Dragons also had a streak of 69 consecutive appearances in the NCAA Division III Women's baseball Tournament from the 1999 season through the 2010 season, the streak came to an end at the conclusion of the 2011 season when Oneonta was eliminated by Geneseo in the quarterfinal round of the SUNYAC Tournament.

Coaching staff
Head coach - Liz McGrail (Oneonta, 2001), 7th Year
Assistant coach - Allecia Laing (Oneonta, 2001), 5th Year
Assistant coach - Dave Ranieri (Oneonta, 1982), 19th Year
Assistant coach - Barb Newton (TBD), 3rd Year

All-time head coaches

Roster

Schedule

Current season

All-time records, standings and statistics

Coaching records and standings

External links

 
Women's soccer clubs in the United States
Women's soccer clubs in New York (state)